Prince Vladimir Fyodorovich Odoyevsky (– ) was a prominent Russian Imperial philosopher, writer, music critic, philanthropist and pedagogue. He became known as the "Russian Hoffmann" and even the "Russian Faust" on account of his keen interest in phantasmagoric tales and musical criticism.

Biography
The last member of the princely House of Odoyev, he was genealogically the most senior member of the House of Rurik. He was born to Prince Fyodor Sergeevich Odoyevsky (1771–1808), a  state councillor (statsky sovietnik). His father started out as an adjutant of Prince Grigory Potyomkin, then, in 1798 he entered civil service as the director of the Moscow Assignant bank. According to one version, his mother, Ekaterina Alekseevna Filippova, was a serf, however, this version has been proven wrong, and it was found out that his mother was a daughter of a praporschik. His widow, Avdotya Petrovna, had a house on the Prechistenka street in Moscow, several servants and a small fortune from her husband. His mother was a well-educated young lady; she could speak French and play the piano. However, the Odoyevsky family regarded this marriage as misalliance. And after his father's death in 1808, his mother was married twice. Part of his childhood was spent with his grandfather, colonel Prince Sergey Ivanovich Odoyevsky, but when he died, his estate in Kostroma Governorate ended up in the hands of an acquaintance of Vladimir's maternal grandmother, the widow of a general, Agrafena Glazova, who took over the properties. In 1812 his mother's house in Moscow was burned down in fire, and he and his mother lived at the estate of Drokovo in Ryazan Governorate, which she took over. While her son was away studying at a boarding school, in 1818–1819 she married sub-porutchik Pavel Sechenov, and having given custody of her son to Agrafena Glazova, settled at Drokovo with her new husband. P. Sechenov turned out to be an abusive husband. Vladimir ended up owing much debt to Glazova, and having settled liabilities, he moved to his grandfather's estate being almost completely broke.

Considered by his contemporaries as a typical Muscovite, he was educated at the Nobility School of the Moscow University in 1816-22. In the mid-1820s, Odoyevsky presided over the Lyubomudry Society, where he and his fellow students met to discuss the ideas of Friedrich Schelling and other German philosophers. At that period, he came to know many future Slavophiles and Westernizers, but refused to identify himself with any of these movements.

Since 1824, Odoyevsky was active as a literary critic and journalist. In 1824 he and Wilhelm Küchelbecker founded the short-lived Moscow literary magazine Mnemozina. In 1826, he moved to St Petersburg, where he joined the staff of the Imperial Public Library.

In the mid-1830s, he co-edited the Sovremennik with Alexander Pushkin. Years later, he was put in charge of the Rumyantsev Museum. Odoyevsky finally returned to Moscow in 1861 but continued to serve as a senator until his death. He is buried in the Donskoy monastery necropolis.

Short stories

Aspiring to imitate Ludwig Tieck and Novalis, Odoyevsky published a number of tales for children (e.g., "The Snuff-Box Town") and fantastical stories for adults (e.g., "Cosmorama" and "Salamandra") imbued with the vague mysticism in the vein of Jakob Boehme and Louis-Claude de Saint-Martin.

Following the success of Pushkin's The Queen of Spades, Odoyevsky wrote a number of similar stories on the dissipated life of the Russian aristocracy (e.g., Princess Mimi and Princess Zizi). On account of his many short stories from the 1820s and 1830s, Odoyevsky should be listed among the pioneers of the impressionistic short story in Europe.

His most mature book was the collection of essays and novellas entitled Russian Nights (1844). Loosely patterned after the Noctes Atticae, the book took two decades to complete. It contains some of Odoyevsky's best known fiction, including the dystopian novellas The Last Suicide and The Town with No Name. The stories are interlaced with philosophic conversations redolent of the French Encyclopedists.

Musical criticism
As a music critic, Odoyevsky set out to propagate the national style of Mikhail Glinka and his followers, denigrating their forebears such as Dmitri Bortniansky. He also wrote a romanticised biography of the Russian violinist Ivan Khandoshkin, whose career he presented as thwarted by the malign influence of such Italian musicians as Giuseppe Sarti. Among his many articles on musical subjects, a treatise about old Russian church singing deserves particular attention, though he expressed strong distaste for strochnoy (early Russian polyphonic) chant: "No human ear could possibly bear the succession of seconds that are constantly to be encountered." Johann Sebastian Bach and Beethoven appear as characters in some of his novellas. Odoyevsky was active in the foundation of the Russian Musical Society, Moscow Conservatory, and St. Petersburg Conservatory.

Technology
Odoyevsky took part in development of electroplating technology, invented by Moritz von Jacobi in Russia. In 1844 Odoyevsky wrote a book, Galvanism applied in technology (Гальванизм в техническом применении). He made a number of experiments and developed cobalt electroplating.

Works
The Year 4338: Petersburg Letters (1835)
The Living Corpse (1844)

English translations
Princess Mimi, The Sylph, and The Live Corpse, (stories), from Russian Romantic Prose: An Anthology, Translation Press, 1979.
The Salamander and Other Stories, (stories), Gerald Duckworth, 1992.
Two Princesses, (novel), Hesperus Press, 2010.
Two Days in the Life of the Terrestrial Globe and Other Stories, (stories), Ama Classics, 2012.

References

Sources

External links
 Russian website on Odoyevsky
 Odoyevsky on the Russian National Library Website
 Works of Odoyevsky
 
Тухманова, З. (2005). «Энгармоническое фортепиано князя В. Ф. Одоевского». Старинная музыка (Литературное агентство ПРЕСТ) 29-30: 23–6. .

1803 births
1869 deaths
Writers from Moscow
Rurikids
Russian art critics
Russian music critics
Short story writers from the Russian Empire
Russian science fiction writers
Inventors from the Russian Empire
Philanthropists from the Russian Empire
19th-century philosophers from the Russian Empire
Founding members of the Russian Geographical Society
19th-century journalists from the Russian Empire
Russian male journalists
Russian male short story writers
Novelists from the Russian Empire
Male writers from the Russian Empire
19th-century novelists from the Russian Empire
19th-century writers from the Russian Empire
Russian male novelists
19th-century short story writers from the Russian Empire
19th-century male writers from the Russian Empire
20th-century Russian short story writers
20th-century Russian male writers
19th-century philanthropists
Writers of Gothic fiction